Cod and related species in the family Gadidae are susceptible to a variety of diseases and parasites.

Laenaeocera branchialis
Lernaeocera branchialis, the "cod worm", is a copepod that infects gadoids. The first host used by cod worm is a flatfish or lumpsucker, which it captures with grasping hooks at the front of its body. It penetrates the lumpsucker with a thin filament, which it uses to suck the host's blood. The nourished cod worm then mates with another one on the lumpsucker. The female worm, with her now-fertilized eggs, then finds a cod, or a cod-like fish, such as a haddock or whiting. There, the worm clings to the gills while it metamorphoses into a plump, sinusoidal, worm-like body, with a coiled mass of egg strings at the rear. The front part of the worm's body penetrates the body of the cod until it enters the rear bulb of the host's heart. There, firmly rooted in the cod's circulatory system, the front part of the parasite develops like the branches of a tree, reaching into the main artery. In this way, the worm extracts nutrients from the cod's blood, remaining safely tucked beneath the cod's gill cover until it releases a new generation of offspring into the water.

Parasites of Atlantic cod

Atlantic cod act as intermediate, paratenic, or definitive hosts to a large number of parasite species; 107 taxa are listed by Hemmingsen and MacKenzie (2001) with seven new records by Perdiguero-Alonso et al. (2008). The predominant groups of cod parasites in the northeast Atlantic were trematodes (19 species) and nematodes (13 species), including larval anisakids, which comprised 58.2% of the total number of individuals. Parasites of Atlantic cod include copepods, digeneans, monogeneans, acanthocephalans, cestodes, nematodes, myxozoans and protozoans:

Monogenea
 Diclidophora merlangi

Trematoda – metacercariae
 Bucephalinae gen. sp.
 Cryptocotyle lingua
 Otodistomum sp.
 Prosorynchoides gracilescens
 Prosorhynchus crucibulum
 Rhipidocotyle sp.

Trematoda – adult
 Derogenes varicus
 Fellodistomum sp.
 Gonocerca phycidis
 Hemiurus communis
 Hemiurus levinseni
 Hemiurus luehei
 Lecithaster sp. ?gibbosus
 Lepidapedon elongatum
 Lepidapedon rachion
 Opechona bacillaris
 Podocotyle reflexa
 Stephanostomum spp.
 Steringotrema sp.

Cestoda – larval forms
 Grillotia sp.
 Hepatoxylon sp.
 Lacistorhynchus sp.
 Scolex pleuronectis
 Pseudophyllidea fam. gen. sp.
 Schistocephalus gasterostei
 Trypanorhyncha fam. gen. sp.
 Unidentified plerocercoids

Cestoda – adult
 Abothrium gadi

Nematoda – larval forms
 Anisakis simplex (s.l.)
 Contracaecum osculatum (s.l.)
 Hysterothylacium aduncum
 Hysterothylacium rigidum
 Pseudoterranova decipiens (s.l.)
 Rhapidascaris sp.

Nematoda – adults
 Ascarophis morrhuae
 Ascarophis crassicollis
 Ascarophis filiformis
 Capillaria gracilis
 Cucullanus cirratus
 Cucullanus sp.
 Hysterothylacium aduncum
 Spinitectus sp.

Acanthocephala – post-cystacanths
 Corynosoma semerme
 Corynosoma strumosum

Acanthocephala – adults
 Echinorhynchus gadi (s.l.)

Hirudinea – adults
 Calliobdella nodulifera
 Johanssonia arctica

Copepoda - larval forms
 Caligus sp. copepodite
 Copepoda fam. gen. sp. copepodite

Copepoda – adults
 Acanthochondria soleae
 Caligus curtus
 Caligus diaphanus
 Caligus elongatus
 Chondracanthus ornatus
 Clavella adunca
 Holobomolochus confusus
 Lernaeocera branchialis

Amphipoda
 Lafystius sturionis

Isopoda
 Gnathia elongata (praniza larva)

References 

This article incorporates CC-BY-2.0 text from the reference: Perdiguero-Alonso D., Montero F. E., Raga J. A. & Kostadinova A. (2008). "Composition and structure of the parasite faunas of cod, Gadus morhua L. (Teleostei: Gadidae), in the North East Atlantic". Parasites & Vectors 2008, 1: 23. doi:10.1186/1756-3305-1-23

Further reading

Fish diseases
Gadidae